The 1976 United States Senate election in New Mexico took place on November 2, 1976. Incumbent Democratic U.S. Senator Joseph Montoya ran for re-election to a third term, but was defeated by Republican Harrison Schmitt. , this is the last time that the Republicans have won the Class 1 Senate seat in New Mexico, and the only time they have done so since 1934.

Background
Harrison Schmitt was a former astronaut who walked on the Moon during the Apollo 17 mission, who was seeking his first political office.

Joseph Montoya had completed two terms in the Senate and was seeking his third. He was well-known as a member of the Senate committee which investigated Watergate.

Republican primary

Candidates
Eugene Peirce, businessman and former state legislator
Harrison Schmitt, former astronaut

Eliminated at convention
Arthur Lavine

Campaign
In the pre-primary convention held on March 27, 1976, Schmitt received 73.7% of the votes and businessman Eugene Peirce received 21%, allowing both to qualify for the primary ballot. A third candidate, Arthur Lavine, received 5.3% of the votes, not enough to be placed on the primary ballot.

Results
In the June 1 primary election, Schmitt defeated Peirce and became the Republican nominee.

General election

Candidates
Joseph Montoya, incumbent U.S. Senator (Democratic)
Harrison Schmitt, former astronaut (Republican)

Campaign
Schmitt campaigned for 14 months, running a forward-looking campaign critical of Montoya's ethical issues. His slogan was "Honesty for a change." On the campaign trail, Schmitt, who was twenty years younger than Montoya, frequently said, "I have time for the future; Senator Montoya does not."

On the campaign trail in October, Senator Montoya repeatedly ridiculed Schmitt's experience as an astronaut by comparing him to a little monkey ("changito"), who could be trained to travel in space.

Results

Schmitt won the election in a decisive victory. Joseph Montoya congratulated Schmitt on his victory, saying "The people have spoken and I accept their verdict."

See also 
 1976 United States Senate elections

References

External links

New Mexico
1976
1976 New Mexico elections
Harrison Schmitt